Unto Ojonen (23 August 1909 Lahti – 12 October 1997 Lahti) was a Finnish architect. His most notable work is from the 1950s and the 1960s. Many of the buildings he designed are in Päijät-Häme, most of those in Lahti. His career lasted over 40 years. During his career he designed nearly 1000 different buildings, over 40 of those are in the city centre of Lahti.

Notable work

Iiti cemetery chapel 
Joutjärvi church	
Pääskylahti cemetery chapel
Vuolenkoski cemetery chapel

References

1909 births
1997 deaths
Finnish architects